Skënder Hyseni (Serbo-Croatian: Skender Hiseni) (born 17 February 1955 in Podujevo) is a Kosovar Albanian politician who is a former Minister of Internal Affairs and a former foreign minister of Kosovo. Hyseni graduated at the University of Pristina, branch of English Language and Literature in 1979. Hyseni stayed for a short period of time for study purposes in Bloomsburg State College-USA (1978) and in Aberdeen University-Scotland (1986).

He was nominated as a Foreign Minister on 3 March 2008. He held the position until 18 October 2010, when he was replaced by Vlora Çitaku. Before holding this position he was the Minister of Culture, Youth, Sport and Non-Residential Affairs in the same government. Hysen had also served as a spokesman for the government and for Kosovan negotiators before the 2008 Kosovo declaration of independence.

Party Affiliation
He is member of the Democratic League of Kosovo (LDK) party.

Portfolio
Past and Present Activities and Functions

 Principal Political Adviser of President Ibrahim Rugova and President Fatmir Sejdiu
 Member of Presidency of LDK party and Secretary for International Relationship
 Spokesman of Unity Team
 Member of Constituent Committee of Kosovo

Notes

References

External links 
 Ministry of Foreign Affairs. Link accessed 2010-08-23. 

1955 births
Living people
Politicians from Podujevo
Kosovo Albanians
Kosovan diplomats
Foreign ministers of Kosovo
Democratic League of Kosovo politicians